Tegula verrucosa is a species of sea snail, a marine gastropod mollusk in the family Tegulidae.

Description
The size of the shells varies between 15 mm and 20 mm.

Distribution
This species occurs in the Pacific Ocean from El Salvador to Peru

References

  McLean J. (1970 ["1969"]). New species of tropical eastern Pacific Gastropoda. Malacological Review, 2(2): 115-130

External links
 To GenBank (2 nucleotides; 1 proteins)
 To USNM Invertebrate Zoology Mollusca Collection
 To World Register of Marine Species
 

verrucosa
Gastropods described in 1970